Norry is an improvised Cambodian railway vehicle

Norry may also refer to:

People
 Lynda Barnes, née Norry
 Charles Norry, 19th Century French architect
 Marilyn Norry

Locations
 Northumberland, Pennsylvania, a borough and county in PA

Homophones
 Norrie disease
 Norrie Paramor